Odontocheila is a genus of beetles in the family Cicindelidae. Unlike many other groups in Cicindelidae, Odontocheila has an XO sex-determination system. Odontocheila beetles have 11 pairs of autosomes. 

Odontocheila contains the following species:

 Odontocheila amabilis Chaudoir, 1860
 Odontocheila angulipenis W. Horn, 1933
 Odontocheila annulicornis Brulle, 1837
 Odontocheila atripes Rivalier, 1970
 Odontocheila baeri Fleutiaux, 1903
 Odontocheila batesii Chaudoir, 1860
 Odontocheila camposi W. Horn, 1925
 Odontocheila camuramandibula Huber, 1999
 Odontocheila cayennensis (Fabricius, 1787)
 Odontocheila chiriquina Bates, 18817
 Odontocheila chrysis (Fabricius, 1801)
 Odontocheila cinctula Bates, 18813
 Odontocheila confusa (Dejean, 1825)
 Odontocheila cyanella Chaudoir, 1860
 Odontocheila cylindrica (Dejean, 1825)
 Odontocheila cylindricoflavescens W. Horn, 1922
 Odontocheila dilatoscapis Huber, 1999
 Odontocheila divergentehamulata W. Horn, 1929
 Odontocheila euryoides W. Horn, 1922
 Odontocheila exilis Bates, 1884
 Odontocheila eximia Lucas, 1857
 Odontocheila fulgens (Klug, 1834)
 Odontocheila gilli Johnson, 2000
 Odontocheila hamulipenis W. Horn, 1933
 Odontocheila howdeni Br. van Nidek, 1980
 Odontocheila ignita Chaudoir, 18603
 Odontocheila iodopleura Bates, 1872
 Odontocheila iodopleuroides Mandl, 1972
 Odontocheila jordani W. Horn, 1898
 Odontocheila luridipes (Dejean, 1825)
 Odontocheila marginata (Fischer, 1821)
 Odontocheila margineguttata (Dejean, 1825)
 Odontocheila marginilabris Erichson, 1847
 Odontocheila mexicana Castelnau, 18352
 Odontocheila molesta Br. van Nidek, 1957
 Odontocheila nicaraguensis Bates, 1874
 Odontocheila nigrotarsalis W. Horn, 1929
 Odontocheila nitidicollis (Dejean, 1825)
 Odontocheila nodicornis (Dejean, 1825)
 Odontocheila parallelaruga Huber, 1999
 Odontocheila quadrina Chevrolat, 18353
 Odontocheila rondoniana Huber, 2000
 Odontocheila rufiscapis Bates, 1874
 Odontocheila rutilans (Klug, 1834)
 Odontocheila salvini Bates, 18749
 Odontocheila scapularis W. Horn, 1896
 Odontocheila simulatrix W. Horn, 1894
 Odontocheila spinipennis Chaudoir, 1843
 Odontocheila sternbergi W. Horn, 1898
 Odontocheila suareziana Huber, 1999
 Odontocheila tawahka Johnson, 1996
 Odontocheila tricuspipenis W. Horn, 1933
 Odontocheila trilbyana Thomson, 1857
 Odontocheila vermiculata Bates, 1872
 Odontocheila yunga Huber, 1999

References

Cicindelidae